ANU is a Tibetan rap duo from China. They were founded in 2016 by Gonpa and Payag. They are from Nangqên County, northwest China's Qinghai province.

Name
"ANU" means "teenagers".

ANU means youth and their full name in Tibetan ཨ་ནུ་རིང་ལུགས། (anu ringlug) literally means the doctrine/philosophy of ANU, or, ANUism.

History
In July 2016, ANU released their first EP ANU, which included two songs, ANU and Living Hometown. On December 27, they released their single, Joke / It's All A Game.

On May 20, 2017, they released their second single, Fly. 

In 2018, their third single GA·GA and fourth single 1376 were released on February 14 and July 31, respectively. High Peaks Pure Earth translated the music video to “1376” into English. The video by ANU features both established and new singers and rappers from all over Tibet, TMJ, Dekyi Tsering, Tashi Phuntsok, Uncle Buddhist and Young13DBaby. 

In January 2019, they participated in China's long-running singing competition Singer 2019 as the first professional challenger of the season and won Pre-Challenge-Face-Off, defeated Liu Yuning.

Many of their songs and music videos have been translated into English by the translations website High Peaks Pure Earth: https://highpeakspureearth.com/tag/anu/

Discography

Studio album

Singles

References

Chinese pop music groups
Mandopop musical groups
21st-century Tibetan male singers
Chinese women rappers